A farewell speech or farewell address is a speech given by an individual leaving a position or place. They are often used by public figures such as politicians as a capstone to the preceding career, or as statements delivered by persons relating to reasons for their leaving. The term is often used as a euphemism for "retirement speech," though it is broader in that it may include geographical or even biological conclusion.

In the Classics, a term for a dignified and poetic farewell speech is apobaterion (ἀποβατήριον), standing opposed to the epibaterion, the corresponding speech made upon arrival.

U.S. presidential farewell addresses 
Many U.S. presidential speeches have been given the moniker "farewell address" since George Washington's address in 1796.  Some notable examples:

 George Washington – Washington's Farewell Address in which he warned of the dangers of political parties and foreign alliances.
Dwight D. Eisenhower – Eisenhower's farewell address in which he warned of the military–industrial complex.
Barack Obama – Obama's farewell address made from Chicago, breaking tradition of holding one in the White House.
Donald Trump – Trump's farewell address, delivered as a recorded, online video message from the White House.

Other notable farewell speeches

Muhammad – Farewell Sermon, 6 March 632. 
The speech of Aeneas to Helenus and Andromache, Aeneid, Book III.
Napoleon Bonaparte – First abdication, April 6, 1814 (see Treaty of Fontainebleau (1814)).
Napoleon Bonaparte  – Farewell to the Old Guard, April 20, 1814.
Napoleon Bonaparte – Second abdication, June 22, 1815 (see Abdication of Napoleon, 1815).
Abraham Lincoln – Farewell address to the people of Springfield, Illinois before departing to be inaugurated as President of the United States.
Robert E. Lee – Farewell address to the Army of Northern Virginia, the day after the end of the American Civil War.
Douglas MacArthur – farewell speeches before Congress and U.S. Military Academy; "old soldiers never die, they only fade away" and "duty, honor, country".

References

 
Speeches by type
Endings